Richard Talbot (died 1262) was a medieval Bishop of London-elect.

Life

Talbot was the nephew of Fulk Basset, Bishop of London. He held the prebends of Mora and Finsbury in the diocese of London before being named treasurer of the diocese by 20 August 1257. He was Dean of St Paul's in London by 26 January 1262. He was elected bishop on 18 August 1262 and that election was confirmed by the archbishop; but Talbot died on either 28 September or 29 September 1262 before he could be consecrated.

Citations

References
 
 
 

Bishops of London
Deans of St Paul's
1262 deaths
13th-century English Roman Catholic bishops
Year of birth unknown